

1990

1991

1992

1993

1994

1995

1996

1997

1998

1999

References

External links
 A Brief History of Computing, by Stephen White. The present article is a modified version of his timeline, used with permission.

1990
C01
Computing